Amarante is a municipality and municipal seat in the Tâmega e Sousa subregion in northern Portugal. The city itself had a population of 11,261 in 2001. The city has been part of the UNESCO Creative Cities Network under the category of City of Music since 2017.

History

Amarante's origin dates to the primitive peoples that hunted and gathered in the Serra da Aboboreira, sometime during the Stone Age, and extended during the Bronze Age and later the Romanization of the Iberian peninsula.

The first prominent building erected during the area of Amarante was likely the Albergaria do Covelo do Tâmega sometime in the 12th century, by order of Queen D. Mafalda, wife of D. Afonso Henriques. These types of shelter were constructed in small settlements and were used by travellers, especially the poor who transited the territory. Permanent settles fixed themselves around the local churches, such as the Church of São Veríssimo and Church of Lufrei, resulting in growth during the intervening years.

The urban agglomeration of Amarante became important and gained visibility with the arrival of Gonçalo (1187-1259) a Dominican friar who was born in Tagilde (Guimarães), who settled in the area following a pilgrimage to Rome and Jerusalém. He was instrumental in the development of the region, with many local structures attributed to his efforts, including the construction of the stone bridge across the Tâmega River. Following his death, Amarante became the destination of pilgrimages and grew substantially.

In the 16th century, King D. John III expanded the local church and resulting in its conversion into a large Dominican monastery. 
The bridge was destroyed by a flood in 1763 and was rebuilt.

In the second French invasion, during the Peninsular War, French forces commanded by Marshall Soult, found themselves at the bridge over the Tâmega, and needed to secure their connection to Spain, while advancing from Porto to Marco de Canaveses through Amarante. Soult, realizing that Beresford's Portuguese and English forces were advancing on him, sent a column to the Tâmega valley, in order to prepare the way for a new column. Under the column, commanded by Loison, through looting, skirmishes and unsuccessful attempts to cross the river, entered in Amarante on 18 April 1809, having looted and burned down the villages of Vila Meã, Manhufe and Pidre. In the village they continue to loot and burn down buildings, except for larger family residences, which were left intact and destined to function as the French headquarters and field hospitals. There are still vestiges of these events, including those in the Estate of Magalhães, the facade of the Church of São Gonçalo, the perforated tiles in the sacristy and the damaged pyramids on the bridge.

The bridge was also significant to the resistance in the northern campaign. Loison did not count on the entrenched conflict between his forces and the Anglo-Portuguese forces, commanded by Brigadier Silveira. These forces, which included badly-equipped, inexperienced citizens and clergy, were able to resist for the next 14 days, impeding the passage of Napoleonic forces, later known as the heroic defense of the bridge of Amarante. The circlement of the bridge ended on 2 May, around 3:00, following a diversionary manoeuvre by French forces that diverted a small pocket of Portuguese stationed at Eira do Paço, who believed the French would attempt to across by Morleiros. Taking advantage of the fog, the French placed gunpowder near the Portuguese trenches along the bridge, then detonated the explosives. These created confusion and panic among the defenders and caused death and injury in their ranks. Loison then continued his journey, until he was forced to withdraw in the upper Douro by Brigadier Silveira's forces, who he had reorganized, during Napoleon's northern march to the city of Lisbon. For his efforts, Silveira was given a cavalry command, owing to his defense of the bridge, and attributed the title of Count of Amarante and elevated to the status of General. The town was also awarded the Order of the Tower and Sword, which it displays on its coats-of-arms.

The municipality of Amarante, administratively, was part of the Minho Province, and abutted the municipalities of Celorico de Basto (to the north), Gestaço (in the east), Gouveia (in the south) and Santa Cruz de Riba Tâmega (in the west). With administrative reforms during the 19th century, the municipalities of Gouveia, Gestaço and Santa Cruz de Ribatâmega were extinguished, and many of the local parishes were absorbed into the Amarante.

Geography

Amarante is situated in the agricultural lands of the Minho region, and belongs to the Porto district, region Norte and sub-region Támega. The Tâmega River runs through the town and is crossed by a large arched bridge, the Ponte São Gonçalo. It is reputed to have helped local forces fend off a French attack in the early 19th century. Nowadays the older centre of town is dominated by a multitude of cafés and restaurants dotted along the steep banks of the southern side of the Tâmega River. Amarante is also associated with the tale of Saint Gonzalo/Gonçalo de Amarante.

Climate

Parishes

Administratively, the municipality is divided into 26 civil parishes:

 Aboadela, Sanche e Várzea
 Amarante (São Gonçalo), Madalena, Cepelos e Gatão
 Ansiães
 Bustelo, Carneiro e Carvalho de Rei
 Candemil
 Figueiró (Santiago e Santa Cristina)
 Fregim
 Freixo de Cima e de Baixo
 Fridão
 Gondar
 Jazente
 Lomba
 Louredo
 Lufrei
 Mancelos
 Olo e Canadelo
 Padronelo
 Real, Ataíde e Oliveira
 Rebordelo
 Salvador do Monte
 São Simão de Gouveia
 Telões
 Travanca
 Vila Caiz
 Vila Chã do Marão
 Vila Garcia, Aboim e Chapa

International Relations

Twin towns — Sister cities

Horta is twinned with:
 Wiesloch, Germany
 Châteauneuf-sur-Loire, France
 Achères, France

Economy
On the abandoned Tâmega railway line between Amarante and Chapa Stations, the Council of Amarante built the ˝Ecopista˝ pathway for bicycles and pedestrians.

The Amarante Golf Course, designed by Portuguese architect Jorge Santana da Silva, lies in Quinta da Deveza and was founded in 1997. It is an 18-hole, par 68 course with a total length of 5.030 metres.

Amarante lies around half a kilometre from the A4 Motorway. There is also a bus station, served principally by Rodonorte, to the south of the Támega river. Between 1909 and 2009 Amarante was served by a narrow gauge railway line, which connected with the main Douro Valley railway line at Livraçao. Amarante station and the entire Tâmega line closed in 2009.

Architecture

The architecture of the Amarante region is mainly in the Romanesque style, with a number of Romanesque monuments (colonnades, arches, tympana and columns) throughout the region. They were built in deserted areas or on crossroads on the outskirts of inhabited areas, serving as meeting places, accommodation and defensive positions. Amarante became part of the Sousa Valley Romanesque Route (Rota do Românico) project on the 12 March 2010.

Important religious buildings can be found to the north of the Tâmega, and include the Travanca monastery, the Mancelos church, the Telões church, the Freixo de Baixo monastery and the Gatão church. On the southern side of the river, can be found the Jazente church, the Lufrei church and the Gondar monastery which are in a more modest style.
 Church of Salvador
 Church of Santa Maria
 Church of São João Baptista
 Convent of São Gonçalo de Amarante
 Monastery of Divino Salvador
 Monastery of Gondar
 Monastery of Lufrei
 Monastery of Mancelos
 Monastery of Telões
 Monastery of São Salvador de Travanca

Notable citizens

 Gundisalvus of Amarante (1187 in Vizela - 1259 in Amarante), Roman Catholic priest and member of the Order of Preachers.  He was canonized in 1560, and beatified in 1561
 Diogo Veloso (1558-1599) a Portuguese adventurer active in Southeast Asia
 José Guedes de Carvalho e Meneses (1814–1879) a Portuguese colonial administrator, governor general of Cape Verde & Mozambique
 António Carneiro (1872–1930) a Portuguese painter, illustrator, poet and art professor.
 Joaquim Pereira Teixeira de Vasconcelos (1877 in Amarante - 1952), a poet, pen name Teixeira de Pascoaes. He was nominated five times for the Nobel Prize in Literature.
 Artur Carlos de Barros Basto (1887–1961), soldier and writer about Judaism.
 Amadeo de Souza-Cardoso (1887–1918) a Portuguese modernist painter
 Augusto Casimiro (1889–1967) a Portuguese journalist, poet and political commentator.
 Agustina Bessa-Luís, (1922–2019) a Portuguese writer of novels
 António Marinho e Pinto (born 1950 in Vila Chã do Marão) lawyer, journalist and politician
 Francisco Assis (born 1965) a Portuguese politician, former MEP & mayor of Amarante

Sport 
 Mário Delgado (born 1924) an equestrian competed at the 1960 Summer Olympics
 António José Alves Ribeiro (born 1965), known as Tozé, is a Portuguese retired footballer with 330 club caps
 Nuno Gomes (born 1976) a former footballer with 463 club caps and 79 for Portugal
 Ricardo Carvalho (born 1978) a retired footballer with 433 club caps and 89 for Portugal

References

External links

Official website
Photos from AMARANTE
Hotel Navarras
Rota do Românico

 
Towns in Portugal
Municipalities of Porto District
Populated places in Porto District